Tibu may refer to:

The Toubou people of the eastern Sahara
Tibú, a city in Colombia
Roman Catholic Diocese of Tibú, Colombia